Lodovic Hugh Gavin (25 October 1878 – 13 November 1940) was an Australian rules footballer who played 108 games for the Essendon Football Club in the years following the formation of the Victorian Football League (VFL).

Football
Gavin, a key defender, was a member of Essendon's inaugural premiership side in 1897 and was listed as Essendon's best player in the 1901 grand final. In 1902 he supposedly won a best and fairest award for his performances for Essendon. He was a regular Victorian representative in interstate football and in 1903 he spent a season in the West Australian goldfields with Boulder City, and being described as the top player of the goldfields in that year. He returned home to Essendon in 1904 and during the season took over as captain of the club.

In 1905 he played with Essendon Association in the Victorian Football Association. He then returned to Western Australia and played with the Boulder Stars in 1906 where he was subsequently suspended for "professionalism" after he sued a club official for agreed wages. Despite his honesty he was sidelined for two years; however, his career still flourished. He captained the 1910 Goldfields side that beat Port Adelaide and then was captain-coach of the 1911 Western Australian carnival side which played at Adelaide. In 1915 he captained Mines Rovers, of the Western Australian Goldfields, to a premiership.

Death
Hugh Gavin died on 13 November 1940 in Melbourne.

References

 Everett, Les. book Gravel Rash – 100 Years of Goldfields Football.
 'Follower', "The Footballers' Alphabet", The Leader, (Saturday, 23 July 1898), p.17.
 Holmesby, Russell and Main, Jim (2007). The Encyclopedia of AFL Footballers. 7th ed. Melbourne: Bas Publishing.
 Maplestone, M., Flying Higher: History of the Essendon Football Club 1872–1996, Essendon Football Club, (Melbourne), 1996. 
 Maplestone, Michael. Those Magnificent Men.

External links
 
 

1878 births
1940 deaths
Australian rules footballers from Victoria (Australia)
Category:Australian Rules footballers: place kick exponents
Essendon Football Club players
Essendon Football Club Premiership players
Boulder City Football Club players
Mines Rovers Football Club players
Essendon Association Football Club players
People from Stawell, Victoria
Two-time VFL/AFL Premiership players